The superior hypophyseal artery is an artery supplying the pars tuberalis, the infundibulum of the pituitary gland, and the median eminence. It is a branch of the ophthalmic part of the internal carotid artery.

References

Arteries of the head and neck